Robert Addison "Bobby" Poynter (born December 5, 1937) is an American retired sprinter.  He ran collegiately for San Jose State College, where he was coached by Bud Winter.  He was the runner up at the 1959 NCAA Championships in the 100 yard dash and 220 yard dash.  In the 220, he lost to San Jose State teammate Ray Norton.  That same year he won a gold medal at the Pan American Games as a member of the American 4x100 meters relay.  During that 1959 season he was ranked #3 in the world in both the 100 meters and the 200 meters.

While at Pasadena High School, he won the 220 at the CIF California State Meet in 1955 and 56.  His 21.0 in 1956 was the state record.  Those same years he placed third and second in the 100, beaten by Ken Dennis in 1955 (later defeating Dennis in the 220).  He was the 1956 CIF Southern Section Athlete of the Year.  In 1957, running for Pasadena City College, he won the California Community College title in the 220 and 100 runner up.

After getting his master's degree at Cal Poly, he coached at Silver Creek High School and also San Jose City College, taking his protégé Millard Hampton to a 1976 Olympic gold medal and individual silver medal.  He had a similar arrangement taking Andre Phillips to eventually achieving a 1988 gold medal.  He was also decathlete Bruce Jenner's sprint coach.  More recently, he is sprint coach at West Valley College.

After USA failed to put an athlete into the final of the 2012 Olympics 400 meters, Poynter was asked for analysis:

References

1937 births
Living people
American male sprinters
Athletes (track and field) at the 1959 Pan American Games
Place of birth missing (living people)
Pan American Games medalists in athletics (track and field)
Pan American Games gold medalists for the United States
Pasadena High School (California) alumni
Medalists at the 1959 Pan American Games
Track and field athletes from San Jose, California